Graftonite is an iron(II), manganese, calcium phosphate mineral with the chemical formula . It forms lamellar to granular translucent brown to red-brown to pink monoclinic prismatic crystals. It has a vitreous luster with a Mohs hardness of 5 and a specific gravity of 3.67 to 3.7.

It was first described from its type locality of Melvin Mountain in the town of Grafton, in Grafton County, New Hampshire.

References
Mindat with location data
Webmineral data

Iron(II) minerals
Manganese(II) minerals
Calcium minerals
Phosphate minerals
Monoclinic minerals
Minerals in space group 14